Nice People was a French reality television show presented by Flavie Flament (daily) and Arthur (specials) and broadcast on TF1 from 26 April 2003 to 5 July 2003. The show was produced by So Nice Production and Endemol.

Principle
The show, inspired by the film L'Auberge Espagnole, put 12 young people representing different European countries in a luxurious villa in the Cote d'Azur in Nice to live for two and a half months. Much as in Loft Story, the French version of Big Brother, broadcast on M6 in 2001 and 2002, these young people were filmed 24 hours and eliminated progressively by the public. Each week, one or two celebrities also visited and stayed a few days with the contestants. The celebrities also joined the contestants in voting whom to evict each week. The winner was Serena Reinaldi.

Candidats

Nominations

Hearings

External links
 
 
 

French reality television series